The Edward Fernley House, at 215 E. 200 North in Beaver, Utah was listed on the National Register of Historic Places in 1983.

It is a one-and-a-half-story brick house with some element of Gothic Revival styling, built around 1885.  A one-story rear extension dates from around 1890.

It was deemed "architecturally significant for several reasons. First, it remains a well preserved example
w of upper-middle class domestic architecture from Beaver's principal years of
x growth, c. 1875–1900. Second, its central passageway plan documents one of
several important dwelling types found in 19th century Utah. Finally, the
large central cross gable with flanking wall dormers house design is unique to
the Beaver-Iron County area of Utah, a design which perhaps can be traced to
the work of the Beaver builder-architect, Thomas Frazer.

References

National Register of Historic Places in Beaver County, Utah
Gothic Revival architecture in Utah
Houses completed in 1885